The Combined Forces Special Enforcement Unit – British Columbia (CFSEU-BC) is a part of the Royal Canadian Mounted Police (RCMP) "E" Division Federal Business Lines that is mandated to provide support and investigation into complex and diverse criminal activities in BC. It was established in 2004 to facilitate the disruption and suppression of organized crime in BC and to support municipal police departments when public safety is deemed to be a priority. It is modelled after other CFSEU units across the country and is currently staffed by RCMP officers and seconded officers from all 11 municipal police forces in British Columbia and Metro Vancouver Transit Police.

As part of an integrated policing approach, CFSEU-BC had undergone undercover operations, seized firearms, illegal drugs, cash and provided support in the rescue of Graham McMynn, son of businessman Robert McMynn.

Mandate
The primary mandate of the Combined Forces Special Enforcement Unit is to expose, investigate, prosecute, dismantle, and disrupt organized criminal enterprises. The second mandate is to share intelligence with partners and to cooperate with, and assist other organized crime enforcement units at the national and international levels.

References

External links
 CFSEU-BC Webpage

Divisions and units of the Royal Canadian Mounted Police
Law enforcement agencies of British Columbia